Rabbi Nechemia Berman was the Chief Rabbi of Uruguay.

Born in the city of Buenos Aires, Argentina, he served as Rabbi of Montevideo's Ashkenazi Community (Comunidad Israelita del Uruguay) from 1977 until 1993. This position has always been considered as Chief Rabbi of the entire Uruguayan Jewish community.

Berman was buried in Jerusalem in 1993.

References

1993 deaths
Argentine Orthodox rabbis
Argentine Ashkenazi Jews
Clergy from Buenos Aires
20th-century rabbis
Chief rabbis of Uruguay
Year of birth missing
Argentine expatriates in Uruguay